El Pinar is a seaside resort of the Canelones Department, Uruguay. In 1994, when Ciudad de la Costa took on the status of a city, El Pinar was incorporated in it.

Geography
El Pinar is the easternmost locality of Ciudad de la Costa, after which starts the group of resorts known as Costa de Oro. Its south limit is the coastline of the Río de la Plata and it shares borders with Lomas de Solymar to the west, with Neptunia to the east, with the stream Arroyo Pando separating the two, and with Country Villa Juana to the north.

Places of worship
 St. Rose of Lima Parish Church (Roman Catholic, Dehonians)

Population
In 2011 El Pinar had a population of 21,091.

Source: Instituto Nacional de Estadística de Uruguay

Street map

References

External links

 INE map of El Pinar

Ciudad de la Costa